This is a list of deputy lieutenants of Wiltshire, England.

Unlike the appointment of High Sheriff, which is for one year, the term of office of a Deputy Lieutenant normally lasts until they reach the age of 75. 

The Wiltshire Lieutenancy has an establishment of up to 36 deputy lieutenants. They are chosen to reflect a wide range of interests and backgrounds, and can be appointed at any age but tend to be aged over 60; they are normally expected to serve for at least five years before they must retire on reaching the age of 75. Deputy lieutenants can be appointed for a set period of time, but this approach has never been adopted in Wiltshire. 

New deputy lieutenants are nominated by the Lord Lieutenant and follow a formal process to confirm their appointment.  The Lord-Lieutenant is not obliged to appoint a new Deputy Lieutenant immediately after a current Deputy Lieutenant retires and thus may hold several vacancies. 

Retired deputy lieutenants can continue to use the post-nominal letters 'DL' after the date of their retirement.

16th-century appointments
Sir Henry Knyvet of Charlton (died 1598)
Sir Matthew Arundell of Wardour Castle (1589–1598)

17th-century appointments
Sir Walter Long (c. 1565 – 1610)
Sir Walter Vaughan (c. 1572 – 1639) of Bishopstone, Salisbury, in office by 1611 and until at least 1633
Anthony Hungerford of Black Bourton (1567–1627), in office c.1610–1624
Thomas Penruddocke (c.1648–1695), commissioned 1683
Sir Gilbert Talbot (c.1606–1695), in office 1688–1689

18th-century appointments
John Baskerville, of Turleigh, Bradford-on-Avon (died 1800)

19th-century appointments

Walter Long (1793–1867) 
Robert Parry Nisbet (1793–1882) 
William Heald Ludlow Bruges (1796–1855) 
Sir Alexander Malet, 2nd Baronet, KCB (1800–1886) 
George Brudenell-Bruce, 2nd Marquess of Ailesbury (1804–1878)
Lord Henry Frederick Thynne (1832–1904)
Sir F. S. Astley
A. Awdry
Sir John Wither Awdry (1795–1878)
Lord Bruce (1804–1878)
E. L. Clutterbuck
Sir William Roger Brown (1831–1902), commissioned 1898

20th-century appointments
Lord Henry Arthur George Somerset (1851–1926)
Walter Hume Long, 1st Viscount Long (1854–1924)
Brigadier-General John Hartman Morgan (1876–1955)
George Petty-Fitzmaurice, 8th Marquess of Lansdowne (1912–1997); resigned 19 February 1973

1946 appointments
Richard Long, 3rd Viscount Long (1892–1967)

1968 appointments
Mr Alfred Edward Batt, 251 Castle Road, Salisbury 
Wing Commander Sir Henry Algernon Langton DSO DFC, Overtown House, Wroughton (1914–1997)
Mr Arthur Guy Stratton, Alton Priors, Marlborough
Arthur Frank Seton Sykes CVO, Stockton, Warminster (1903–1980)
Group Captain Frank Andrew Willan, Bridges, Teffont, Salisbury (1915–1981)
Brigadier George Wort CBE, The Old Rectory, Hilcot, Pewsey

1974 appointments
Nigel James Moffatt Anderson  (1920–2008)

1978 appointments
Sir Maurice Henry Dorman GCMG GCVO, The Old Manor, Overton, Marlborough (1912–1993)
Dr Timothy Kindersley Maurice, 10 Kingsbury Street, Marlborough 
Lieutenant-Colonel John Godfrey Jeans, Chalke Pyt House, Broadchalke, Salisbury
Lieutenant (Honorary Captain) Richard Flower Stratton, Kingston Deverill, Warminster
Rear-Admiral Harry Desmond Nixon, Ashley Cottage, Ashley, Box, Corsham
Lieutenant-Colonel Charles Hugh Antrobus, Wootton House, Wootton Rivers, Marlborough

1979 appointments
Daniel Edmund Awdry (1924–2008)

1983 appointments
Reginald John Richard Arundell
John Morrison, 1st Baron Margadale (1906–1996)
Mary Ethel Salisbury (1917–2008)
Sir Peter Malden Studd (1916–2003)
Major Anthony Richard Turner

1990 appointments
Lieutenant-General Sir Robin Macdonald Carnegie KCB OBE, of Chilmark 
Captain Beresford Norman Gibbs, of Oaksey, late Royal Horse Guards
Lieutenant-General Sir Maurice Robert Johnston KCB OBE, of Worton (born 1929)
Charles Petty-Fitzmaurice, 9th Marquess of Lansdowne (born 1941)
Major David Alwyne Carne Rasch, of Middle Woodford

1993 appointments

John Seymour, 19th Duke of Somerset, of Bradley House, Maiden Bradley

1996 appointments
Mr Richard David Stratton OBE, Manor Farm, Kingston Deverill, Warminster
General Sir John Finlay Willasey Wilsey, GCB CBE ADC, P. O. Box 56, Shaftesbury

1997 appointments
Lady Margaret Josephine Benson, Pauls Dene House, Salisbury
Major-General Patrick Guy Brooking, Downlands House, Stonehenge Road, Amesbury
Mr David John Randolph, West Foscote Farm, Grittleton, Chippenham
Mr Eric Walker, 2 Penfold Gardens, Old Town, Swindon

1998 appointments
Mr John Barnard Bush (born 1937), Fullingbridge Farm, Heywood, Westbury
Mr Charles Giles Clarke, Holt Manor, Holt
Mrs Anna Ruth Grange, Thornhill Farm, Malmesbury
Mr Patrick John Wintour, Weavers House, Bromham, Chippenham

1999 appointments
Brigadier Arthur Gooch, Manor Farm, Chitterne
Mrs Christine Cooke, JP, Church Hill House, Donhead St Mary
Mrs Susan Eliot-Cohen, Hilldrop Farm, Ramsbury
Lady Hawley, Little Cheverell House, Little Cheverell
Peter Manser, Chisenbury Priory, East Chisenbury

2000 appointments
Brigadier Robert John Baddeley, Hazeldon House, Wardour, Tisbury
Mr Philip John Miles, Middle Farm, Stanley, Chippenham

2002 appointments
Mr Robert Noyes Lawton CBE, North Farm, Aldbourne, Marlborough
Mr David Bedingfield Scott, Nursteed House, Devizes

2003 appointments
Mrs Sara Jones CBE, Orchard, Manor Farm Lane, Great Wishford, Salisbury
Alastair John Morrison, 3rd Baron Margadale of Islay, The Quadrangle, Tisbury, Salisbury
Mr William Francis Wyldbore-Smith, Bremhill Manor, Calne

2004 appointments
Lieutenant-General Sir Roderick Alexander Cordy-Simpson KBE CB, The Coach House, Mill Lane, Bishopstrow, Warminster
Mr David Kim Hempleman-Adams OBE, Hatt House, Box
Mr William John Fishlock, 41 Windsor Road, Swindon

2006 appointments
Mrs Nicky Morrison, Whisper Cottage, Compton Bassett
The Right Reverend June Osborne, The Deanery, The Close, Salisbury
Mr Tim Pap OBE, Mallards, Chirton, Devizes
Mrs Sarah Troughton, Lynch House, Wanborough
His Honour Judge John McNaught, Swindon Combined Courts, Swindon

2007 appointments

Lord MacLaurin of Knebworth (born 1937), Rowley Grange, Farleigh Hungerford
General Sir Michael David Jackson GCB CBE DSO (born 1944), Stocktree Cottage, Great Bedwyn
 Professor Christopher Paul Mullard, CBE

2009 appointments
Sir Michael Edward Pitt, Garden Cottage, Foxley, Malmesbury
The Hon. Peter John Pleydell-Bouverie, Newcourt, Downton, Salisbury
Mrs Margaret Madeline Wilks, Box Cottage, North Newnton, Pewsey

2011 appointments
Richard Handover, Marlborough
Christopher Hoare, Potterne
Angus Macpherson, Police and Crime Commissioner
Luke March, Salisbury
Dame Elizabeth Neville, former Chief Constable of Wiltshire

2013 appointments
Alan Fletcher, of The Avenue, Stanton Fitzwarren, Swindon
Robert Hiscox, of Rainscombe Park, Oare, Marlborough

2015 appointments
Helen Browning OBE
General Sir John Freegard Deverell KCB

2016 appointments

The Hon. Richard John Tennant Arundell
Mrs Helen Judith Birchenough
Dr Philip Anthony Harding
Dr David Peter Hemery CBE

2018 appointments
District Judge Simon Nicholas Cooper
Deepak Gupta
Shirley Kathleen Ludford
Victoria Jane Nye

2019 appointments
Mrs Amanda Judith Burnside
Air Vice-Marshal David Cyril Couzens
The Marchioness of Lansdowne

2021 appointments 

 Minette Batters, farmer
 Claire Garrett, charity CEO 
 Stephanie Millward, swimmer, Paralympic gold medallist
 Sebastian Warrack, director and CEO of Wiltshire Creative (Salisbury Playhouse, Salisbury International Arts Festival and Salisbury Arts Centre)

See also
Lord Lieutenant of Wiltshire

Deputy Lieutenants
Deputy Lieutenants of Wiltshire

References